Mecano was a pop music band from Madrid, Spain formed by Ana Torroja, Nacho Cano and José María Cano. 

Mecano may also refer to:

Mecano (album), first studio album recorded by the band in 1982
Mecano, a person who was born in the city of Mecca

See also
Meccano, a British model construction system
Mecanoo, a Dutch architecture firm